Michael Edward Burns (born May 14, 1962) is an American assistant men's college basketball coach at Boise State.

Early life and education
Born in Tacoma, Washington, Burns graduated from Tyee High School in SeaTac in 1980. Burns first attended Idaho State University after high school. He later returned to the Seattle area to work as a concert promoter and worked with several grunge bands.

Coaching career
Burns became an assistant coach at Highline College, a junior college in Des Moines, Washington. After three years at Highline, Burns returned to Tyee High School as co-head coach for the 1995–96 season. From 1996 to 1999, Burns worked as an assistant coach at Central Washington University.

Burns was an assistant at Stephen F. Austin State University in the 1999–2000 season before returning to Washington state as an assistant coach for Eastern Washington under Ray Giacoletti in 2000. Burns became associate head coach in 2002. In 2003, Burns was an assistant coach at Washington State under Dick Bennett.

Burns returned to Eastern Washington in 2004 as head coach.  For 2007-2008, Burns was head coach at Community Colleges of Spokane, leading the team to a 30-2 record and year-long #1 ranking in the Northwest Athletic Association of Community Colleges league. His team had a 24-game winning streak snapped with a one-point loss in the title game against Yakima Valley CC. He was named the NWAACC Coach of the Year, and the NWAACC East Region Coach of the Year.

In 2008, Burns left and was an assistant coach at University of San Diego under Bill Grier. In June 2015, Burns was an assistant coach at the University of the Pacific under Ron Verlin. Burns took over as interim head coach on December 11, 2015.

On May 25, 2016, Burns joined Leon Rice's staff at Boise State as an assistant coach.

Head coaching record

References

1962 births
Living people
Basketball coaches from Washington (state)
Boise State Broncos men's basketball coaches
Central Washington University alumni
Eastern Washington Eagles men's basketball coaches
High school basketball coaches in Washington (state)
Idaho State University alumni
Junior college men's basketball coaches in the United States
Pacific Tigers men's basketball coaches
San Diego Toreros men's basketball coaches
Sportspeople from Tacoma, Washington
Stephen F. Austin Lumberjacks basketball coaches
Washington State Cougars men's basketball coaches